Lagos Terminus, also known as Lagos Iddo,  has been the main railway station of the city of Lagos until 2021. The rail terminus is located on Iddo Island, nearby Lagos Island and in the middle of the city.

Overview
The station, located in front of Carter Bridge and by the Lagos Lagoon, has a large two floor terminal building. It counts also a pair of train sheds: one located just outside the station platforms and a larger one located 2 km north, nearby Lagos Yaba station.

The line serving Lagos Terminus, as well as the entire national network, is not electrified; and the track gauge is narrow (1,067 mm).

Services
Lagos station is the terminus of commuter and long distance trains, as for example the flagship express train to Kano, in north of Nigeria and 1,126 km far from Lagos. A standard gauge high-speed line, connecting Lagos to Abuja, has been planned in early 2010s, as part of the development plan of the Nigerian railways.

Lagos Terminus will be served by two lines (red and blue) of the future Lagos Metro, under construction, at Iddo metro station.

See also
Lagos Rail Mass Transit
Rail transport in Nigeria
Railway stations in Nigeria

References

External links

Lagos Terminus
Lagos Metropolitan Area Transport Authority